The 2014 FIA WTCC Race of China, Beijing was the ninth round of the 2014 World Touring Car Championship season and the fourth running of the FIA WTCC Race of China. It was the first of two rounds held in China in 2014, the second taking place at the Shanghai International Circuit the following weekend. It was held on 5 October 2014 at the Goldenport Park Circuit in Beijing, China.

Race one was won by Tom Chilton for ROAL Motorsport and race two was won by Robert Huff for Lada Sport, the manufacturer's first victory in the World Touring Car Championship.

Background
José María López led the drivers' championship coming into the round, sixty points ahead of teammate Yvan Muller. Franz Engstler held the lead of the Yokohama Trophy.

The event was a late replacement for the FIA WTCC Race of the United States which was cancelled in June 2014 due to logistical issues. The Beijing race will form half of a Chinese double–header with the originally planned Shanghai race the following weekend.

Felipe De Souza joined Liqui Moly Team Engstler for the remained of the 2014 season, replacing Pasquale Di Sabatino. Michael Soong joined Campos Racing in a TC2T SEAT León and Ma Qing Hua returned to Citroën Total WTCC.

Report

Testing and free practice
The first test session took place in wet conditions and Tiago Monteiro set the fastest time ahead of López and Robert Huff.

Monteiro was quickest again in the first free practice session with Citroën pair López and Ma Qing Hua second and third. The session ended 40 seconds early when López beached his car in the gravel at turn eight.

Ma set the fastest time in the final free practice session ahead of Huff and Gianni Morbidelli as the sun set, the session was stopped two minutes early due to the deteriorating light conditions.

Qualifying
Monteiro topped the first part of qualifying which was stopped twice; early on De Souza went off at the last corner and beached his Engstler BMW in the gravel trap. Later on Dušan Borković spun off and damaged his car which was then recovered by the marshals. Franz Engstler qualified 18th to take pole in the TC2T class.

López was fastest in the second part of qualifying while Monteiro finished 11th having led three out of the four sessions so far during the weekend. James Thompson was eighth and his Lada teammate Huff was tenth and therefore took pole for race two with Tom Coronel starting alongside him. López, Muller, Gabriele Tarquini, Morbidelli and Chilton made it through the Q3 shootout with Norbert Michelisz narrowly missing out.

Having been fifth in Q2, Chilton set his time first and it would go unbeaten for the rest of the session. Tarquini was second with the Citroëns of Muller and López ahead of Morbidelli.

Race One
Chilton got away from pole while Muller jumped ahead of Tarquini to take second. After three laps the safety car came out following a collision between René Münnich and Borković. The race resumed on lap 11 with no immediate change in the order at the front although Tarquini was enduring pressure from López for third place. Michelisz moved up to fifth place at the expense of Sébastien Loeb who had also lost a place to Morbidelli. Monteiro went into the pits at half distance having struggled to get his car around the last lap. At the front Chilton was extending his lead while further back Ma took eighth off Thompson to put himself on the tail of teammate Loeb. On lap 23 Ma went off and dropped behind Thompson, Huff and Mehdi Bennani down to eleventh place. The following lap Tarquini returned to the pits for repairs, as did Coronel, Mikhail Kozlovskiy and Ma. Hugo Valente slowed with a puncture as Chilton claimed his first victory of the season ahead of Muller and López. Franz Engstler took victory in the TC2T class.

Race Two
Prior to the race Honda had taken Monteiro's car out of parc fermé and he was dropped to the back of the grid for race two. Kozlovskiy was unable to start the race following on from technical issues in race one. Huff started on pole and narrowly beat Coronel into the first corner as Loeb jumped up to third ahead of Thompson who then lost another place to Michelisz. Bennani was given a drive–through penalty for a breach of the start procedure on the second lap. By the third lap Monteiro had moved up to 12th ahead of Ma as further back De Souza spun and recovered. Chilton had moved up to eighth since the start and had passed a struggling Muller, by half distance he was attacking Morbidelli for seventh although he would be unable to make further progress during the race. López had taken fourth place on lap 17 to increase his points haul over Muller, leaving him with ten laps to close the three second gap to Loeb who was still running third. In the final laps Coronel began closing in on race leader Huff while López had more than halved the gap to Loeb. Huff claimed the first WTCC victory for Lada, Coronel finished second while Loeb and Lopez were neck–and–neck to the line with Loeb claiming the final podium spot by three-hundredths of a second ahead. Franz Engstler claimed the TC2T class victory once again.

Results

Qualifying

Bold denotes Pole position for second race.

Race 1

Bold denotes Fastest lap.

Race 2

Bold denotes Fastest lap.

Standings after the event

Drivers' Championship standings

Yokohama Trophy standings

Manufacturers' Championship standings

 Note: Only the top five positions are included for both sets of drivers' standings.

References

External links
World Touring Car Championship official website

China, Beijing
FIA WTCC Race of China, Beijing
FIA WTCC Race of China, Beijing